The following is a list of characters in the ABC comedy television series Samantha Who?.

Primary characters

Recurring characters

Former main/recurring characters

Samantha Who?